This is a List of notable former students of the school Haileybury in Keysborough, Brighton and Berwick, Victoria, Australia. They are known in the school as "Old Haileyburians".

Academia
 Professor Jeff Borland – Professor of Economics at the University of Melbourne
 Professor Roderick Weir Home – Senior Lecturer, Foundation Professor of History and Philosophy of Science at The University of Melbourne and Fellow of the Australian Academy of the Humanities, awarded the Academy Medal of The University of Melbourne
 Dr Russell Kenley – Chair in Management at Swinburne University
 Professor David Lowe – Professor of History at Deakin University
 Douglas Chisholm Winston Maroney (1943-2007) – Lawyer and Chair of Luther College (Victoria) 2000-2007.
 Professor Julian Savulescu – Professor of Ethics at Oxford University
 Dr. Joe Rock - University of Edinburgh PhD 1997 (1966-68 Rendall House)

Business
 Bruce Akhurst – CEO of Sensis

Clergy
 Gregor Henderson – President of the Uniting Church in Australia

Media, entertainment and the arts

 Rahart Adams – Actor
 Jamie Blanks – Film Director
 John Carmichael – Noted composer and pianist
 Maddison Connaughton – Editor of The Saturday Paper
 Kim Dalton – Head of ABC Television
 Houston Dunleavy – Composer and conductor
 Adam Elliot – Academy Award winning animation artist
 Richard Franklin – Hollywood Director; Patrick, Psycho II and Roadgames
 William Franklyn – Renowned actor and voice artist
 Ian Henderson – Anchorman for the ABC
 Jeremy Kewley – Actor
 Zara McDonald – Co-host of Shameless (podcast)
 Anna McEvoy – Winner of Love Island Australia Season 2
 Robert Menzies – Actor
 Khan Ong - DJ and Third Place Finalist of MasterChef Australia Series 10 
 Ross Wilson – Rock musician

Law
 Sir Wilfred Fullagar – Justice of the High Court of Australia and Knight Commander of the Order of the British Empire
 Lex Lasry – Judge of the Supreme Court of Victoria
 Simon Molesworth –  Acting Judge of the Land and Environment Court of New South Wales (2017), environmental and planning lawyer, company director, Chairman of the Steering Committee, previously Chairman of the Australian Council of National Trusts
 Ross Sundberg – Judge of the Federal Court of Australia

Military

 George Webster Binnie – Lieutenant in the Australian Army during World War I, and Director of Websters Limited, Sydney.
 Rupert Downes – Major General of Medical Services in the Australian Army and world-renowned Surgeon
 Jack Hazlitt – Renowned World War I Veteran
 Charles Henry Langtree – Lieutenant in the British Army during World War I, and AFL Footballer with Collingwood
 Principal Air Chaplain Royce Thomas – Director General Chaplaincy Services Air Force
 Geoffrey Travers – Corporal in the Australian Army during World War I.
 James Sidney Swanton Vickery – Private in the Australian Army during World War I.

Politics
 Tim Holding – Former Victorian Labor MLA for Springvale 1999-2002 & Lyndhurst 2002-2013.
 Martin Pakula – Labor Party member of the Parliament of Victoria
 Alan Tudge – Liberal Party of Australia Federal MP for Aston 2010-
 Nick Wakeling – Victorian Liberal MLA for Ferntree Gully 2010-

Science and Medicine
 Sir Hibbert Alan S. Newton – Foundation fellow and President of the Royal Australasian College of Surgeons and Chairman of the Medical Equipment Control Committee
 Dr. Leon Garner – made Office of the New Zealand Order of Merit for services to Optometry
 Dr. Douglas Travis – President of the Australian Medical Association, Victoria
 Dr. Lachlan Gray – Deputy Head, HIV Neuropathogenesis Laboratory Burnet Institute, Victoria

Sport

 Karl Amon – AFL Footballer, Port Adelaide Football Club
 Warren Ayres – Cricketer for Melbourne CC. ( Captain) Victoria Sheffield Shield
 Josh Battle – AFL Footballer, St Kilda Football Club
 Aiden Bonar – AFL Footballer, North Melbourne Football Club
 Alice Burke (footballer) – AFLW Footballer, St Kilda Football Club
 Andrew Brayshaw – AFL Footballer, Fremantle Football Club
 Angus Brayshaw – AFL Footballer, Melbourne Football Club
 Hamish Brayshaw – AFL Footballer, West Coast Eagles
 Brett Collins – AFL Footballer, drafted to Hawthorn in 2006.
 Kieran Collins – AFL Footballer, Western Bulldogs
 Charlie Constable – AFL Footballer, Geelong Football Club
 Luke Davies-Uniacke – AFL Footballer, North Melbourne Football Club
 Tory Dickson – AFL Footballer, Western Bulldogs
 Isabella Eddey – AFLW Footballer, North Melbourne Football Club
 Stuart Edwards – AFL Footballer, Richmond Football Club
 Nathan Freeman – AFL Footballer, St Kilda
 Jack Gunston – AFL Footballer, Adelaide Football Club & Hawthorn Football Club
 Brett Harrop – Cricketer for Victoria cricket team
 Gerry Hazlitt – Test Cricketer for Australia
 Ian Herman – AFL Footballer, Carlton Football Club
 Jon Holland – Cricketer for Victoria cricket team
 Paul Hopgood – AFL Footballer, Melbourne Football Club
 Jack Hutchins – AFL Footballer, Gold Coast Football Club
 Phillip Hyde – Cricketer for Victoria cricket team
 Ben King – AFL Footballer, Gold Coast Football Club
 Max King – AFL Footballer, St Kilda Football Club
 Stewart Loewe – AFL Footballer, St Kilda
 James Magner – AFL Footballer, Melbourne
 Stefan Martin – AFL Footballer, Melbourne & Brisbane Lions
 Jarred Moore – AFL Footballer, Sydney Swans
 Brett Moyle – AFL Footballer, St Kilda
 Steven O'Dor – Young Socceroos and Wellington Phoenix soccer player
 James Pattinson – Test cricketer for Australia
Oscar Piastri – Formula 1 driver for McLaren
 Cameron Polson – AFL Footballer, Carlton Football Club
 Hugo Ralphsmith – AFL Footballer, Richmond Football Club
 Sean Ralphsmith – AFL Footballer, St Kilda Football Club, Hawthorn Football Club
 Robert Rose – AFL Footballer, Collingwood Football Club & Footscray Football Club, Cricketer for Victoria
 Laetisha Scanlan – Australian Athlete, Sport Shooting and Gold Medalist at the 2014 Commonwealth Games and 2018 Commonwealth Games
 Arthur Scott – AFL Footballer, St Kilda
 Jack Scrimshaw – AFL Footballer, Hawthorn Football Club
 Tom Scully – AFL Footballer, Greater Western Sydney Giants & Hawthorn
 Sam Sheldon – AFL Footballer, Brisbane Lions
 Alex Silvagni – AFL Footballer, Fremantle Football Club
 Ashley Smith – AFL Footballer, West Coast Eagles
 Dylan Smith – AFL Footballer, Fremantle & North Melbourne Football Club
 Robert Stone - Australian Athlete, member of the Australian Olympic Team at the 1988 Seoul Olympics
 James Thiessen – AFL Footballer, Adelaide Crows
 Shane Valenti – AFL Footballer, Melbourne Football Club
 Ty Vickery – AFL Footballer, Richmond
 Brett Voss – AFL Footballer, St Kilda
 Cody Weightman – AFL Footballer, Western Bulldogs Football Club
 Marcus Windhager

Other
 Bashir Ebrahim — Awarded Medal of the Order of Australia for 22 years of service to the nation’s blind and vision impaired community
Andrew Freeman FACS - Fellow of the Australian Computer Society (elected in 1997), and an Honorary Life Member (HLM) of the ACS (elected in 2018) 
 Jack McConnell – Pioneering Architect, awarded the RAIA Gold Medal and member or the Order of Australia
 Peter Barrie Smith – Awarded Medal of the Order of Australia for contribution to Horticulture
 Basil George Watson — Pioneer Australian aviator

See also
 List of schools in Victoria
 List of high schools in Victoria
 List of largest Victorian Schools
Associated Public Schools of Victoria

References

External links
 Haileybury College website
 Old Haileyburians Association

Haileybury College
Haileybury College
Haileybury
People educated at Haileybury (Melbourne)
 List